A Trap for Santa Claus is a 1909 one-reel American silent drama film. A Biograph Company production, it was directed by D. W. Griffith and stars Henry B. Walthall, Marion Leonard, and Gladys Egan.

Plot
Arthur Rogers (Walthall) is an unemployed, drunkard husband and father who has no money for a Christmas celebration. A title describes the situation as "misery and want, the family's lot." Helen Rogers (Leonard), his wife, cries with their daughter over their poverty. Arthur leaves to go to the tavern. He asks the bartender (Sennett) to put an alcoholic drink on his tab, which he refuses. Two patrons buy drinks for Arthur and invite him to their table. He becomes intoxicated and returns home to a frightened wife and daughter (Egan). Arthur is described as "helpless, the father leaves the house of sorrow." He writes a letter: "Dear Helen, you will be better off without me. I leave for good. May God help you. Arthur." He slides the letter through the door, then leaves. Helen picks up the letter to read his words. Arthur returns to the bar, where he drinks to the point of unconsciousness. The bartender picks him up and throws him outside. Helen and her daughter leave the house to go to an employment agency, but are turned away. They return to the house to find the son (Tansey) ate their only food: a small loaf of bread. His arm is also in an unexplained sling.

An attorney stops at Helen's house to tell her of litigations that have cleared, and she is now the beneficiary of her late aunt's estate. She and the children are overjoyed. Helen is seen wearing a luxurious hat, as the attorneys direct her to her new home. It is furnished with lavish embellishments, but its only flaw is that it is without a chimney. On Christmas Eve, Helen tells the children that Santa Claus will come through the window. She drags the children to bed. They pray, and she kisses them and tucks them into bed. The children sneak out of bed to set a trap by the window. The purpose of the trap is unclear, but a logical conclusion is to make Santa trip and fall, causing a commotion, and thus witness him to prove his existence. Helen bought a Santa costume and happily considers dressing up to fool her children into believing that Santa is real. She is saddened to realize that the costume should be worn by a male, namely her husband. She is unaware that her husband now makes his living as a burglar. He sees the mansion and trespasses through the window, not knowing that it now belongs to his wife. Arthur is caught in the trap. Helen catches her husband's attempted burglary against her and their children. She is shocked, and he is ashamed. Arthur begs for her to take him back, and she agrees after a long consideration. Arthur plays Santa Claus for his children.

Cast
Henry B. Walthall as Arthur Rogers
Marion Leonard as Helen Rogers
Gladys Egan as The Rogers' Daughter
Kate Bruce as The Maid
William J. Butler as The Attorney
W. Chrystie Miller as The Grandfather
John Tansey as The Rogers' Son
Charles Craig as The Bar Patron
Anthony O'Sullivan as The Bar Patron
Mack Sennett as The Bartender

See also
 List of Christmas films

References

External links

1909 films
1900s Christmas drama films
American black-and-white films
American Christmas drama films
Films directed by D. W. Griffith
American silent short films
1909 drama films
1909 short films
1900s English-language films
1900s American films
Silent American drama films
Santa Claus in film